The Oliver and Margaret Jeffrey House is a house located in northeast Portland, Oregon listed on the National Register of Historic Places.

See also
 National Register of Historic Places listings in Northeast Portland, Oregon

References

External links
 

1916 establishments in Oregon
Alameda, Portland, Oregon
Colonial Revival architecture in Oregon
Houses completed in 1916
Houses on the National Register of Historic Places in Portland, Oregon